Salvador Cordero (born 11 March 1996) is a Chilean footballer who plays for Deportes Antofagasta.

References

1996 births
Living people
Chilean footballers
Chilean Primera División players
C.D. Antofagasta footballers
Association football defenders